John Thomas Sproule (5 December 1876 – 10 November 1940) was a Conservative member of the House of Commons of Canada. He was born in Lambton County, Ontario and became a farmer, a livestock dealer, and a businessman in the oil and cement industry.

Sproule served on the Oil Springs municipal council for 25 years and was the village's reeve for 11 years. He became a director of the Ontario Good Roads Association in 1924. Sproule was an unsuccessful candidate in the 1926 Ontario election.

He was first elected to Parliament at the Lambton East riding in the 1930 general election. After serving one term in the House of Commons, riding boundaries were changed and Sproule was a candidate for the new Lambton—Kent riding where he was defeated by Hugh MacKenzie in the 1935 election.

References

External links
 

1876 births
1940 deaths
Canadian businesspeople
Canadian farmers
Conservative Party of Canada (1867–1942) MPs
Members of the House of Commons of Canada from Ontario
Ontario municipal councillors
People from Lambton County